Mariam binte Jaafar (born 1977) is a Singaporean politician. A member of the governing People's Action Party (PAP), she has been the Member of Parliament (MP) representing the Woodlands division of Sembawang GRC since 2020.

Early life and education
Mariam grew up in a 1-room HDB flat with her parents and siblings. Her father was a Malay language teacher while her mother was a nurse. 

She attended Raffles Girls' Primary School for three years before transferring to Bukit View Primary School. When she was 13 years old, Mariam received the MENDAKI Scholarship from then-Deputy Prime Minister Goh Chok Tong. 

Mariam attended Raffles Girls' School and Raffles Junior College before graduating from Stanford University in 2000 with a Bachelor of Science degree and a Master of Science degree in electrical and electronics engineering. 

She subsequently went on to complete a Master of Business Administration degree at Harvard Business School in 2006.

Career 
Following her graduation from Harvard Business School, she worked at Boston Consulting Group. She is currently a Managing Director and Partner at the BCG office in Singapore and is a core member of the firm's Technology, Media & Telecommunications and Financial Institutions practices.

In 2016, Mariam was chosen to be a member of the Committee on the Future Economy, chaired by Finance Minister Heng Swee Keat. Mariam serves on the board of directors at the Government Technology Agency and at the Sentosa Development Corporation. She is also on the board of governors at her alma mater, Raffles Girls' School.

Political career 
In the 2020 election, Mariam was nominated as a candidate of the ruling People's Action Party (PAP) for Sembawang GRC. On 10 July, she was elected to the Parliament, defeating the opposition candidates from the National Solidarity Party (NSP).

Personal life 
Mariam is married to Heng Teck Thai.

References

External links 
 Mariam Jaafar on Parliament of Singapore
 Mariam Jaafar on Instagram
 Mariam Jaafar on Facebook

1977 births
Living people
Singaporean people of Malay descent
Stanford University alumni
Harvard Business School alumni
People's Action Party politicians
Singaporean women in politics
Raffles Girls' Secondary School alumni
Raffles Junior College alumni
Members of the Parliament of Singapore